Rolf Linus Wahlqvist Egnell (born 11 November 1996) is a Swedish professional footballer who plays for Pogoń Szczecin as a defender.

Career
Wahlqvist arrived at IFK Norrköping from his boyhood club Eneby BK in 2009. For the 2013 Allsvenskan season he was moved up to the first team where he eventually switched position from central defender to right fullback at the start of the following year. On 6 April 2014, he made his Allsvenskan debut in the 2–0 win against Helsingborgs IF.

In July 2018, Wahlqvist joined 2. Bundesliga side Dynamo Dresden on a four-year contract. The transfer fee was undisclosed.

In July 2020, Wahlqvist announced that he would leave Dynamo Dresden upon the team's relegation to 3. Liga, activating a clause in his contract to terminate it in with immediate effect.

He left on 4 August 2020 to join Norrköping.

On 10 December 2022, it was announced Wahlqvist would join Polish Ekstraklasa club Pogoń Szczecin on a deal until June 2026, starting from 1 January 2023.

International career
In September 2013 Wahlqvist was selected to the Sweden national under-17 football team that would compete in the 2013 FIFA U-17 World Cup, in which he helped the team to the bronze medal.

Wahlqvist was also a part of the Sweden U21 team that competed at the 2017 UEFA European Under-21 Championship, in which he missed a crucial penalty kick against England before Sweden was eliminated in the group stage of the tournament.

Wahlqvist made his senior international debut for Sweden against Estonia in January 2016.

Career statistics

Club

International

Honours
IFK Norrköping
Allsvenskan: 2015
Sweden U17
 FIFA U-17 World Cup third place: 2013

References

External links

IFK Norrköping profile

1996 births
Living people
Footballers from Östergötland County
Sportspeople from Norrköping
Association football defenders
Swedish footballers
Sweden international footballers
Sweden youth international footballers
Sweden under-21 international footballers
IFK Norrköping players
Dynamo Dresden players
Pogoń Szczecin players
Allsvenskan players
2. Bundesliga players
Ekstraklasa players
Swedish expatriate footballers
Expatriate footballers in Germany
Expatriate footballers in Poland
Swedish expatriate sportspeople in Germany
Swedish expatriate sportspeople in Poland